Draba yukonensis, also known as the Yukon draba or the Yukon whitlow-grass, is a species of plant of the Draba genus. It is endemic to the Yukon, Canada. It is listed as imperiled by NatureServe.

References 

Endemic flora of Canada
yukonensis